Karen Young (March 23, 1951 — January 26, 1991) was an American disco singer known for her 1978 hit song "Hot Shot".

Biography
Young grew up in a Northeast Philadelphia rowhouse. She began as a singer of jingles and backing vocalist for Philadelphia-based production companies. In the early 1970s, she performed with the group Sandd, featuring Frank Gilckin (lead guitar), George Emertz (rhythm guitar), Frank Ferraro (bass guitar) and Dennis Westman (drums).

In 1978, Young released the single "Hot Shot", written and produced by (Andy) Andrew Kahn and Kurt Borusiewicz. The song spent two weeks at number 1 on Billboard'''s disco chart and eventually peaked at number 67 on the Billboard Hot 100 in 1978. An album, also titled Hot Shot, was then released by West End Records of New York City. The song propelled Young to international fame. By 1981, the disco fad had dissipated, and Young was unable to duplicate her success. Young continued her singing career as a local performer in the Philadelphia area, and the song "Hot Shot" became a hit.

She died at age 39 of a possible bleeding peptic ulcer on January 26, 1991, at her home in Susquehanna, Pennsylvania.

"Hot Shot" in popular culture
"Hot Shot" was featured in the 1990 film Reversal of Fortune and in the 2020 documentary The Times of Bill Cunningham. The song was a featured sample in Daft Punk's song "Indo Silver Club" on their album Homework''. The song was also used by the BBC in the mid-1980s during its coverage of the World Snooker Championship for "hot shots" compilations during the tournament. Hot Shot was covered by the pop band, Blondie and included as a bonus track on the Japan and South Africa editions of their comeback album, No Exit.  Various remixes of the song were released in 2007. "Hot Shot" made three separate appearances in the UK Singles Chart in 1978, 1979, and 1997. The highest placing was number 34.

"Rendezvous with Me," a song written by Kahn in 1979, was intended as a follow-up to "Hot Shot," but it was never finished. Discovered in Kahn's tape vault, "Rendezvous with Me" was released by MaxRoxx Music in March 2009.

Discography

Albums

Singles

See also
List of Billboard number-one dance club songs
List of artists who reached number one on the U.S. Dance Club Songs chart

References

External links
 Altramoda.nl
 Karen Young at Bandcamp
 Karen Young at Webstarts
 Karen Young at Discogs.

1951 births
1991 deaths
American women pop singers
American contraltos
American dance musicians
American disco musicians
West End Records artists
Musicians from Philadelphia
20th-century American women singers
20th-century American singers